Roberto Contreras (1928–2000) was an American actor best known for playing Pedro in the TV western series The High Chaparral. His film and television career spanned nearly 40 years from 1954 to 1993, including featured roles in Topaz and Scarface.

He played the bartender in “Heritage of Anger” S2 E37 of Have Gun Will Travel 6-6-59.

The son of director Jaime Contreras, he was born on December 12, 1928, in St. Louis, Missouri. He is also the father of actor Luis Contreras. Contreras died on July 18, 2000, in Los Angeles, California.

Filmography

La rebelión de los colgados (1954)
En carne viva (1954)
The Beast of Hollow Mountain (1956) - Carlos (uncredited)
The Black Scorpion (1957) - Chumacho (uncredited)
Ride a Violent Mile (1957) - Abruzo (uncredited)
The Flame Barrier (1958) - Village Indian
The Badlanders (1958) - Pepe (uncredited)
Holiday for Lovers (1959) - Policeman (uncredited)
The Miracle (1959) - Knife Grinder (uncredited)
The Magnificent Seven (1960) - Villager (uncredited)
Gold of the Seven Saints (1961) - Armenderez, Gondora Gunman
California (1963) - Lt. Sanchez 
Rio Conchos (1964) - Mexican at Corral (uncredited)
Mara of the Wilderness (1965) - Friday
Brainstorm (1965) - Asylum Inmate (uncredited)
Marriage on the Rocks (1965) - Assistant (uncredited)
Alvarez Kelly (1966) - Sanchez (uncredited)
The Appaloosa (1966) - Flacco the Pulqueria Bartender (uncredited) 
The Professionals (1966) - Bandit (uncredited)
Chubasco (1967) - Wheelman (uncredited)
The Last Challenge (1967) - Hotelero (uncredited)
Topaz (1969) - Muñoz
El extraño caso de Rachel K (1973)
Pets (1973) - The Gardener
Cantata de Chile (1976)
Black Samurai (1977) - Chavez
The Dark (1979) - Max
The Day Time Ended (1979) - Gas station attendant 
Barbarosa (1982) - Cantina Owner
Scarface (1983) - Emilio Rebenga
Blue City (1986) - Hot Dog Vendor
The Underachievers (1987) - Hispanic Man
Blood In, Blood Out (1993) - Cruz's Grandfather (final film role)

References

External links 
 
 The High Chaparral Home Page

1928 births
2000 deaths
American male television actors
Male actors from St. Louis
20th-century American male actors